is a Japanese actor associated with Stardust Promotion's Section 2. Ino debuted as an actor in 2009 and has notably appeared in the films Demolition Girl (2017) and Touken Ranbu (2019). He has also starred in several stage play adaptations, such as Hyper Projection Engeki: Haikyu!!, Blood Blockade Battlefront, My Hero Academia: The "Ultra" Stage, and Persona 5: The Stage.

Personal life

Ino attended Hosei University beginning in 2011 and graduated in 2015. In November 2022, Ino was reported to be dating AKB48 member Nana Okada.

Works

Television

Theatre

Music video

Film

Solo DVDs

Publications

Photobooks

References

External links
  

21st-century Japanese male actors
Japanese male stage actors
Japanese male television actors
Living people
Stardust Promotion artists
1992 births